The Bocholt textile museum is a museum in Bocholt, a city in the north-west of North Rhine-Westphalia, Germany, part of the district Borken. It is situated 4 km south of the border with the Netherlands.
The museum opened in 1989 as one of the eight locations of the LWL Industrial Museum: it is an Anchor point on the European Route of Industrial Heritage.

Context
Munsterland, the area of land that straddles the German Dutch border was known for cotton. The soil was not fertile and from the 16th century additional income was gained from flax production to make linen, which was woven into a rough sail cloth. With the 19th century Bocholt was producing fustian (tree silk), a compound cloth of linen warp and cotton weft. This was exported. The textile merchants then established cotton mills that exploited these skills and trade links.

Buildings
The museum is set in two buildings on the opposite side of the river Aa. The first is the spinning mill of Spinnerei Herding. The second is a reconstructed single storey weaving shed with its typical sawtooth roofs. In the weaving shed 30 looms remain operational.

History
Herdings mill was commissioned in 1907. It was designed by the Swiss architects Sequin and Knobel as a model mill. There were automated looms from the U.S. and 23,000 cotton spindles.

Museum
The museum opened in 1989 as one of the eight locations of the LWL Industrial Museum. 

The weaving shed is a reconstruction of the 'websaale' at Weberei Gebr. Essing in Rhede which was demolished in 1985. The museum retrieved the cast iron columns that supported the roof and the lineshafting. This firm had equipped its shed in 1889 to 1894 with 50 looms tented by 25 weavers. The museum can operate 32 looms currently and uses the rest of this shed to display other textile machines.

In the engine house there is a 1917 tandem compound stationary steam engine that came from the Baumwollweberei Heuveldop Also reconstructed is and office, a workers house and an engineering workshop of that period.

Collections
In the weaving shed, only a part of the collection is displayed. Since 1984 samples have been collected of all aspects of the spinning (mule and ring spinning), weaving (raw cotton weaving, coloured woven goods, ribbon weaving) process and the finishing processes (bleaching, dyeing, printing). In addition, the fields of knitting (vests, jumpers), embroidery, ornamental textiles (ribbons, braiding and trimmings), lace and curtain-making are separate themes within the collection.

The museum stores contain complete specialised workshops and an extensive collection of historic pattern books, fabric samples, designs and drawings.

The spinning mill is used for exhibition, meeting space and temporary displays.

See also
Queen Street Mill

References
Notes

Footnotes

External links

 LWL Industriemuseum Website 
 Munsterland Cotton Route 

Museums in North Rhine-Westphalia
Industry museums in Germany
Textile museums in Germany
European Route of Industrial Heritage Anchor Points
Textile museum